João Capistrano Maria Bussotti Neves Júnior (born 10 May 1993, in Maputo) is a Mozambican and Italian of Mozambican descent middle-distance runner competing primarily in the 1500 metres. He won five times the national championships.

Biography
Of Mozambican and later acquired Italian citizenship, Bussotti Neves emigrated to Italy with his mother Claudine in 2002. His step father is from Livorno where Joao lives and trains. He took up athletics in 2007. He was cleared by IAAF to compete for Italy since May 2012.

Personal bests
Outdoor
800 metres – 1:47.55 (Orvieto 2016)
1500 metres – 3:37.12 (Marseille 2017)

Indoor
1500 metres – 3:42.82 (Prague 2015)

Achievements

National titles
Bussotti won five national championships.
 Italian Athletics Championships
 1500 metres: 2017, 2018, 2020 (3)
 Italian Indoor Athletics Championships
 800 metres: 2015
 1500 metres: 2015

See also
Naturalized athletes of Italy

References

External links

1993 births
Living people
People from Maputo
Italian male middle-distance runners
Italian sportspeople of African descent
Athletics competitors of Gruppo Sportivo Esercito
Naturalised citizens of Italy
Mozambican emigrants to Italy
Athletes (track and field) at the 2018 Mediterranean Games
Mediterranean Games competitors for Italy
Italian Athletics Championships winners